Victoria "Vicky" Jenson (born March 4, 1960) is an American film director of both live-action and animated films.  She has directed projects for DreamWorks Animation, including Shrek, the first film to win an Academy Award for Best Animated Feature, giving rise to one of Hollywood's largest film franchises.

Career

Biography and early work 
Jenson began painting animation cells at the age of 13. She attended the Academy of Art University in San Francisco and California State University Northridge. She "started in animation as a cell painter. She learned to paint backgrounds on The Flintstones (1960) and The Smurfs (1981) at Hanna Barbera Studios where she worked summers to cover fall semesters at the Academy of Art University in San Francisco". She later became a storyboard artist for Warner Bros., Marvel and Disney Television, and variously worked as a production designer, art director and co-producer". In the early 1980s, Jenson worked on the storyboard backgrounds on the He-Man and the Masters of the Universe cartoon series for Filmation. She was also a design and color stylist on Mighty Mouse: The New Adventures, the influential Ralph Bakshi reboot of Mighty Mouse, in the 1980s. She held the same position with The Ren & Stimpy Show in the early 1990s, for creator John Kricfalusi. For both Mighty Mouse and Ren & Stimpy, Jenson was among those "responsible for the development of the visual style" of the series. In 1992, Jenson was the art director for FernGully: The Last Rainforest, and the production designer for Computer Warriors: The Adventure Begins and Playroom. In 2000, Jenson began working for DreamWorks as a production designer and story artist for The Road to El Dorado.

Directing career
Having worked on The Road to El Dorado (2000) for DreamWorks, the studio initially hired Jenson to work on Shrek as a story artist, with the directors to be Andrew Adamson (also a first-time director) and the late Kelly Asbury, who had joined in 1997 to co-direct the film. However, Asbury left a year later for work on the 2002 film Spirit: Stallion of the Cimarron, and Jenson was selected by producer Jeffrey Katzenberg to be the new director of the film. Jenson recalled her experience being brought into Shrek, and eventually tapped to direct, as follows:

Jenson described the directing process as one in which "we didn't try to figure out how to make adolescents laugh. You have to use yourself as the best judge and use your own instincts. We figured if we laughed at it, chances are good someone else would too".  According to Adamson, the co-directors mutually decided to split the work in half, so the crew could at least know whom to go to with specific questions about the film's sequences: "We both ended up doing a lot of everything", "We're both kinda control freaks, and we both wanted to do everything." Following the success of Shrek, Jenson went on to co-direct Shark Tale with Bibo Bergeron and Rob Letterman. In 2003, while working on Shark Tale, Jenson received the first annual Kiera Chaplin Limelight award given at the Women's Image Network Awards.

In July 2017, it was reported that Jenson was directing an untitled animated fantasy film. The film tells of a teenager who "comes of age using magical powers to defend her family when the opposing forces of light and darkness threaten to divide her kingdom. The untitled project was now being titled Spellbound.

Live-action work 
She directed a live-action short, Family Tree, which "premiered at Sundance, screened at countless festivals, including Sundance, SXSW, Aspen and Malibu and went on to win multiple festival awards". In 2009, she finished her first live-action feature directorial work for the Alexis Bledel-starring comedy, Post Grad. The film received generally negative reviews. Also in 2009, Jenson directed all of the spots for the year-long "Modelquins" ad campaign for Old Navy, including the "Supermodelquins Christmas" ads. She was represented by the Anonymous Content agency for the campaign.

In 2015, Jenson directed a stage production of the play, Time Stands Still, by Donald Margulies. The Los Angeles Times wrote of Jenson's stage directorial debut: "the staging by Vicky Jenson successfully captures the script's broad contours", and Broadway World praised the production, stating that "Vicky Jenson smoothly directs her uniformly skilled four-member cast".

Filmography

Feature films

Television

Awards and nominations

Personal life
Jenson is the sister of classical violinist Dylana Jenson. When she's not working in the studio, Jenson enjoys ultralight backpacking, learning to play mandolin and teaching her border collie pointless new tricks.

References

External links

Chris Koseluk, "On Co-Directing Shrek: Victoria Jenson", AnimationWorld Network (May 10, 2001)
Profile in "Women Directors Hollywood Should Be Hiring from Vulture.com
Profile in "Hollywood's Most Inspiring Female Directors"
Profile in "Best Women Film Directors and Movies" from Metacritic.com

1960 births
American animators
Living people
American storyboard artists
American animated film directors
American women film directors
Annie Award winners
Background artists
DreamWorks Animation people
Filmation people
Hanna-Barbera people
Skydance Media people
Directors of Best Animated Feature Academy Award winners
American women animators
Academy of Art University alumni
People from Los Angeles